Lil or LIL may refer to:

Use as a short form of "little"

Artists

Lill Babs, Swedish musician
Lil B, American rapper      
Lil'B, Japanese pop duo
Lil Baby, American rapper
Lil Bibby, American rapper
Lil Bitts, Trinidadian musician
Lil Boi, South Korean rapper
Lil' Boosie, American rapper
Lil' Bow Wow (today only Bow Wow), American rapper and actor
Lil' Brotha, American rapper
Lil Bruce, American rapper
Lil' Buck, American musician
Lil Buck, American dancer
Lil' C, American dancer
Lil' C-Note, American actor and rapper
Lil' Cease, American rapper
Lil' Chris, British pop singer
Lil Dicky, American rapper and comedian
Lil Durk, American rapper
Lil Duval, American comedian
Lil E, American rapper 
Lil' Ed Williams, American musician
Lil' Eddie, American singer
Lil' Fame, American rapper
Lil' Flip, American rapper
Lil' Fizz, American rapper and actor     
Lil Gotit, American rapper
Lil iROCC Williams, American rapper
Lil Italy, American rapper
Lil' J, American rapper
Lil' JJ, American actor
Lil Jon, American rapper and music producer
Lil Keed, American rapper
Lil' Keke, American rapper
Lil' Kim, American rapper
Lil' Kleine, Dutch rapper
Lil' Louis, American musician
Lil' Malik (now known as Mr. Malik), American rapper
Lil' Mama, American rapper
Lil McClintock, American musician
Lil' Mo, American singer
Lil' Mo' Yin Yang, American house duo
Lil Mosey, American rapper
Lil Nas X, American rapper and singer
Lil' Nation, American rapper
Lil' O, American rapper
Lil' P-Nut, American rapper
Lil Pappie, Canadian rapper
Lil Phat, American rapper
Lil Peep, American rapper
Lil Pump, American rapper
Lil Reese, American rapper
Lil Rel Howery, American comedian and actor 
Lil' Rev, American musician
Lil Ric, American rapper
Lil Rob, American rapper
Lil' Romeo (now known simply as "Romeo"), American actor and rapper
Lil' Ronnie, American music producer
Lil Rounds, a contestant on Season 8 of American Idol
Lil Ru, American rapper
Lil' Scrappy, American rapper
Lil Skies, American rapper
Lil' Son Jackson, American musician
Lil Suzy, American singer
Lil' T, Danish rapper and singer
Lil Tecca, American rapper
Lil Tracy, American rapper
Lil Tjay, American rapper
Lil' Troy, American rapper
Lil Tuffy, American artist
Lil Ugly Mane, American rapper and producer
Lil Uzi Vert, American rapper 
Lil Wayne, American rapper
Lil Weavah, American actor
Lil' Wil, American rapper
Lil' Wyte, American rapper
Lil Xan, American rapper
Lil Yachty, American rapper
Lil' Zane, American rapper and dancer
Lil Zay Osama, American rapper

Other
Li'l Abner, cartoon character
Li'l Sebastian, Pawnee Miniature Horse
Lil Bub, Internet celebrity cat

Short for "Lillian" 
Lil Hardin Armstrong (1898–1971), American jazz pianist, composer, arranger, singer and bandleader, second wife of Louis Armstrong
Lil Green (1919–1954), American blues singer and songwriter
Lil DeVille, a character on the American animated television show Rugrats

LIL 
IATA code for Lille Airport, France
ICAO code for FlyLAL-Lithuanian Airlines, the national airline of Lithuania
Little Implementation Language, an early UNIX system programming language

See also
Lill-Babs, Swedish musician

Hypocorisms